Abraham Lincoln's Peoria speech was made in Peoria, Illinois on October 16, 1854.  The speech, with its specific arguments against slavery, was an important step in Abraham Lincoln's political ascension.

The 1854 Kansas–Nebraska Act, written to form the territories of Kansas and Nebraska, was designed by Stephen A. Douglas, then the chairman of the Senate Committee on Territories. The Act included language that allowed settlers to decide whether they would or would not accept slavery in their region. Lincoln saw this as a repeal of the 1820 Missouri Compromise which had outlawed slavery above the 36°30' parallel.

History
Lincoln was compelled to argue his case against the Kansas-Nebraska Act in three public speeches during September and October 1854, all in direct response to Douglas.  The most comprehensive address was given by Lincoln in Peoria, Illinois, on October 16. The three-hour speech that evening on the lawn of the Peoria County Courthouse, transcribed after the fact by Lincoln himself, presented thorough moral, legal, economic, and historical (citing the Founding Fathers) arguments against slavery, and set the stage for Lincoln's political future.

Horace White was a young journalist working as the city editor of the Chicago Evening Journal when he first saw Lincoln:

White described the speakers:

White described Lincoln's style of speaking in colorful terms:

Lincoln's speech in many ways foreshadowed the political future that he would soon embark upon:

See also
 Abraham Lincoln on slavery

References

Further reading
 Lehrman, Lewis E., Lincoln at Peoria: The Turning Point, Mechanicsburg, Pennsylvania: Stackpole Books, 2008.
 Wilson, Douglas L., "Lincoln's Rhetoric," Journal of the Abraham Lincoln Association, 34 (Winter 2013), 1–17.

Primary sources
 

1854 in Illinois
1854 works
Peoria, Illinois
Presidents of the United States and slavery
Peoria speech
October 1854 events
1854 speeches